Pupilloidea is a superfamily of small and very small air-breathing land snails, terrestrial gastropod mollusks in the infraorder Pupilloidei .

Taxonomy
This superfamily contains the following families:
 Achatinellidae Gulick, 1873
 Agardhiellidae Harl & Páll-Gergely, 2017
 Amastridae Pilsbry, 1910
 Argnidae Hudec, 1965
 Cerastidae Wenz, 1923
 Cochlicopidae Pilsbry, 1900 (1879)
 Draparnaudiidae Solem, 1962
 Enidae B. B. Woodward, 1903 (1880)
 Fauxulidae Harl & Páll-Gergely, 2017
 Gastrocoptidae Pilsbry, 1918
 Lauriidae Steenberg, 1925
 Odontocycladidae Hausdorf, 1996
 Orculidae Pilsbry, 1918
 Pagodulinidae Pilsbry, 1924
 Partulidae Pilsbry, 1900
 Pleurodiscidae Wenz, 1923
 Pupillidae W. Turton, 1831
 Pyramidulidae Kennard & B. B. Woodward, 1914
 Spelaeoconchidae A. J. Wagner, 1928
 Spelaeodiscidae Steenberg, 1925
 Strobilopsidae Wenz, 1915
 Valloniidae Morse, 1864
 Vertiginidae Fitzinger, 1833
Synonyms
 Cerastuidae Wenz, 1930: synonym of Cerastidae Wenz, 1923
 Chondrulidae A. J. Wagner, 1928: synonym of Chondrulini Wenz, 1923 (junior synonym)
 Cionellidae L. Pfeiffer, 1879: synonym of Cochlicopidae Pilsbry, 1900 (1879)
 Elasmiatidae Kuroda & Habe, 1949: synonym of Elasmiatini Kuroda & Habe, 1949 (original rank)
 Family Pachnodidae Steenberg, 1925: synonym of Cerastidae Wenz, 1923
 Pupidae J. Fleming, 1822: synonym of Cerionidae Pilsbry, 1901 (invalid: type genus a junior homonym of Pupa Röding, 1798 [Acteonidae])
 Pupisomatidae Iredale, 1940: synonym of Valloniidae Morse, 1864
 Pupoididae Iredale, 1939: synonym of Pupillidae W. Turton, 1831
 Strobilidae Jooss, 1911: synonym of Strobilopsidae Wenz, 1915 (invalid: type genus a junior homonym of Strobila M. Sars, 1829 [Cnidaria])
 Tornatellinidae Sykes, 1900: synonym of Tornatellininae Sykes, 1900 (original rank)
 Zuidae Bourguignat, 1884: synonym of Cochlicopidae Pilsbry, 1900 (1879)

References

 Bouchet P., Rocroi J.P., Hausdorf B., Kaim A., Kano Y., Nützel A., Parkhaev P., Schrödl M. & Strong E.E. (2017). Revised classification, nomenclator and typification of gastropod and monoplacophoran families. Malacologia. 61(1-2): 1-526

External links
 Harl J., Haring E., Asami T., Sittenthaler M., Sattmann H. & Páll-Gergely B. (2017). Molecular systematics of the land snail family Orculidae reveal paraphyly and deep splits within the clade Orthurethra (Gastropoda: Pulmonata). Zoological Journal of the Linnean Society. 181(4): 778-794
 Saadi, A. J.; Mordan, P. B.; Wade, C. M. (2021). Molecular phylogeny of the Orthurethra (Panpulmonata: Stylommatophora). Zoological Journal of the Linnean Society.

 
Gastropod superfamilies
Taxa named by William Turton